3 Gold Coins is a 1920 American silent Western film directed by Clifford Smith and starring Tom Mix. It was produced and distributed by Fox Film Corporation. It is believed to be a lost film.

Plot 
Things are not going well for Bob Fleming.  Then, while showing off for Betty Reed and her father (Frank Whitson), he shoots through three gold coins, which Bob keeps as lucky charms.

J. M. Ballinger and Rufus Berry arrive in the township of Four Corners and proceed to plant oil on Fleming's property, with plans to sell stock to the townsfolk.  Bob is implicated in the scheme and arrested for fraud.

In the end, it turns out there really is oil on Fleming's land.

Cast

See also
 1937 Fox vault fire
 Tom Mix filmography
 List of American films of 1920

References

External links

 
 
 Lobby poster

1920 films
1920 Western (genre) films
1920 lost films
American black-and-white films
Fox Film films
Lost American films
Lost Western (genre) films
Silent American Western (genre) films
Films directed by Clifford Smith
1920s American films